Jeffrey Hudson (1619 – circa 1682) was a court dwarf of the English queen Henrietta Maria of France. He was famous as the "Queen's dwarf" and "Lord Minimus", and was considered one of the "wonders of the age" because of his extreme but well-proportioned smallness. He fought with the Royalists in the English Civil War and fled with the Queen to France but was expelled from her court when he killed a man in a duel. He was captured by Barbary pirates and spent 25 years as a slave in North Africa before being ransomed back to England.

Early life and rise to prominence
Hudson was baptised in Oakham in Rutland on 14 June 1619. His parents, three brothers, and a half-sister were all of typical size. Hudson's father John was keeper of the baiting bulls for George Villiers, Duke of Buckingham. Hudson's marvellous smallness and normal proportions became apparent in early childhood. Various theories existed for his size, including that his mother choked on a gherkin while pregnant, but he probably suffered from a growth hormone deficiency caused by a pituitary gland disorder.

In 1626, Jeffrey Hudson was presented to the Duchess of Buckingham as a "rarity of nature" and she invited him to join the household. A few months later, the Duke and Duchess entertained King Charles I and his young French wife, Queen Henrietta Maria, in London. The climax of the lavish banquet was the presentation of Jeffrey to the Queen, served in a large pie. The Queen was delighted and the Duke and Duchess of Buckingham offered Hudson to her as an amusing gift.

Hudson at the Queen's court

Hudson moved into Denmark House in London in late 1626, where the Queen maintained her royal household, with its many French attendants and Catholic priests. He was one of several natural curiosities and pets, among whom were a giant Welsh porter named William Evans, two disproportionate dwarves, and a monkey called Pug. He later developed a routine with Evans in which the porter pulled Hudson out of his pocket along with a loaf of bread, and proceeded to make a sandwich. As he matured, Hudson learned to amuse and entertain with his wit and courtly behaviour as well as his appearance. Dwarves were not rare in the courts of Europe but Hudson's fine proportions and tiny size made him uniquely famous. His size was repeatedly described as 18 or 19 inches and he is reported to have grown little between 7 and 30 years of age. He was often cast in picturesque roles in the elaborate costumed masques which were staged by Inigo Jones for the amusement of the court.

Hudson rode a horse with the queen and her household. Sidesaddles were provided for ten ladies and three laundry maids, while the "dwarffe" was provided with an elaborate livery saddle of velvet with laces and silver and silk fringes. The court tailor Gilbert Morrett made clothes for Hudson. He had "an ash colour barracan suit with sleeves" and "a black mourning suit of Flanders say", and scarlet hose to wear under his armour. The Queen's tailor George Gillin made clothes for the female dwarf Sarah, or "little Sara", including an Italian gown of scarlet baize. Hudson and Sarah were dressed with the same fabrics as Henrietta Maria's own children. Daniel Mytens was commissioned to paint his portrait, "a picture at large of Jeffry the dwarf in a wood or wilderness", for £40 in 1627.

In 1630, at about 10 years of age, Hudson was included in a mission to France. Although the principal purpose of the mission was to return with a midwife for the Queen's first pregnancy, it is likely that Hudson was sent for the appreciation of the French court. On the return journey across the channel their ship was captured by Dunkirk pirates, who plundered the ship but eventually released them to return to England. Hudson's second trip across the Channel occurred in 1637, at age 18, when a group of courtiers travelled to the Netherlands to observe the siege of Breda, as the Dutch were attempting to expel the Spanish army.

Hudson was educated in the Queen's household and learned the manners of the court. He was brought up in the Roman Catholic Church of her household. He learned to ride a horse and shoot a pistol. He was celebrated in a variety of poems and narratives of the day. However, despite his wit and intelligence, it was the novelty of his shortness that was most prized and all understood that if he had been of normal height he would have had no place at court. This is explicitly acknowledged in one of several adulatory poems.

The coming of the Civil War and the dissolution of the court
By 1640 the relationship between King Charles and the Parliament had deteriorated to the point of plots and attempted arrests. Armed conflict broke out between the Royalists and the Parliamentarians in 1642. As Charles led the Royalist army, the Queen took a small number of her retinue, including Hudson, to the Netherlands to raise money and support for him. By selling articles from her palace she raised enough to buy some supplies for the Royalist army but was unsuccessful in obtaining official support from the Protestant Dutch government. She returned to England with her courtiers and they found themselves in the middle of a civil war.

They were able to join Royalist forces at Oxford. The Queen appointed Hudson a "Captain of Horse." It is not known whether he commanded troops or saw combat in one of Prince Rupert's cavalry raids, but he considered the appointment an honour rather than a joke and later in life continued to style himself as "Captain Jeffery Hudson".

As it became apparent that the war was broadening rather than concluding, the Queen fled to France in 1643 with a small group of courtiers and household staff, again including Hudson. Although they were warmly received in France and provided with space in the Louvre Palace, the Queen was ailing after a difficult delivery and she soon moved her court in exile to the spa at Nevers.

Duel and disaster
Royalist courtiers collected around the Queen, but Hudson apparently had no interest in resuming his role of pet or clown and let it be known he would suffer no more jokes or insults. There is no record of the precise offence offered, but in October 1644, Hudson challenged the brother of William Crofts to a duel. Crofts arrived at the duel brandishing a large water squirt gun, but his flippancy would lead to his death, as Hudson fatally shot him in the forehead. Crofts's death was a disaster for Hudson. Duelling had been outlawed in France and this could be considered a transgression against hospitality, in addition to the fact that William Crofts was a powerful figure as the Queen's Master of Horse and head of her lifeguard. Hudson was initially sentenced to death, but Henrietta Maria interceded for his life, and he was sent back to England.

Slavery and redemption, poverty and death
Hudson's movements after leaving the Queen's court in late 1644, aged 25 years, are unknown. Within months he was on a ship captured by the Barbary pirates. Hudson was taken to North Africa as a slave, where he spent perhaps his next 25 years labouring. The date and circumstances of his rescue or redemption are not known but it was in the 1660s that several missions were sent from England to Algeria and Tunis to ransom English captives, and his first documented presence back in England was in 1669. No details of his captivity were recorded except one fact: he claimed to have grown to  during this time, doubling his height after 30 years of age, which he attributed to the "buggery" he had regularly suffered at the hands of his captors.

The few contemporary records of Hudson's years between 1669 and his death in 1682 consist of a few receipts for grants of money from the Duke of Buckingham and the new King. He did not return to the Queen's court, even after the royal Restoration in 1660 and her return at the invitation of her son, Charles II. She resided in London for only five years, fleeing to France during the London plague of 1665. She died in France in 1669, the year Hudson first reappeared in English records.

Hudson lived in Oakham for several years, where he was interviewed and a short record of his life made, by James Wright the antiquarian. In 1676 Hudson returned to London, perhaps to seek a pension from the royal court. He had the misfortune of arriving at a time of turbulent anti-Catholic activity, which included the "Popish Plot" of Titus Oates (also from Oakham), and was imprisoned "for a considerable time" at the Gatehouse Prison. Being a "Roman Catholick" was his only recorded offence, but he was not released until 1680. He died about two years later on an unknown date, in unknown circumstances, buried in an unmarked Catholic paupers' grave. A payment from Charles II in 1661 is the last record of Hudson.

See also
List of slaves
Richard Gibson (painter) – another Stuarts' dwarf

Notes

References

Page, Nick. Lord Minimus: The Extraordinary Life of Britain's Smallest Man (London: HarperCollins, 2002) 

1619 births
1682 deaths
Entertainers with dwarfism
English duellists
People captured by pirates
British slaves
Victims of the Popish Plot
People from Oakham
Slaves from the Ottoman Empire
17th-century slaves
Court of Charles I of England
Household of Henrietta Maria